Asif Basra (27 July 196712 November 2020) was an Indian actor who worked in Bollywood films and TV serials. He is best known to Western audiences for his role in Outsourced. He also appeared in many other films.  Basra died of suicide by hanging in 2020.

Early life and education
Basra was born on 27 July 1967 in Amravati, Maharashtra, India. In 1989, he moved to Mumbai and attended Mumbai University, and acted in college productions. He regularly won prizes for the characters he played in college time. He graduated with a Bachelor's degree of Physics.

Acting career
Basra performed in Anurag Kashyap's Black Friday and Rahul Dholakia's Parzania, which received much critical appreciation. He appeared in Michael O. Sajbeland's One Night with the King with veteran actors like Omar Sharif and Peter O'Toole. He played a tailor in the Hindi movie Lamhaa; he was in Bollywood's 2010 top grossing film Once Upon a Time in Mumbaai as Shoaib's (Emraan Hashmi) father. Basra was also known for his theatrical performances from playing five characters in Feroz Abbas Khan's production of Mahatma v/s Gandhi. Other performances include a child with spina bifida in Main Bhi Superman and Horatio in Hamlet.

In 2020, Basra appeared in two web series: Paatal Lok streamed on Amazon Prime and Hostages on Hotstar. He worked in Hindi, Gujarati, Tamil, and Malayalam films. He was last seen in the second season of the Amazon Prime Video web series The Family Man which released on 4 June in 2021.

Death
Basra was found hanging in a private complex in McLeod Ganj, in Dharamshala, Himachal Pradesh on 12 November 2020. , the police and a forensic team are investigating the matter.

Filmography

Film

Web series

References

External links
 
 
 

1967 births
2020 deaths
2020 suicides
Indian male film actors
20th-century Indian male actors
21st-century Indian male actors
University of Mumbai alumni
People from Amravati
Suicides by hanging in India
Artists who committed suicide